Probar - Indústria Alimentar, SA is a Portuguese company headquartered in Coimbra, which produces cold meat products. Its products include a wide range of processed meat, like sausages, smoked meats, sliced and wafer thin meats, fresh sausages and ready meals, and barbecue sausages, as well as dry, cooked, and chopped hams. It was formerly known as Probar – Companhia de Produtos Alimentares Barreiros, S.A. and changed its name to Probar - Indústria Alimentar, SA in March 2003. Probar was founded in 1967 in Coimbra, Portugal.

See also
Agriculture in Portugal
Charcuterie
Portuguese cuisine

References

External links
Official site

Brand name meats
Meat companies of Portugal
Food and drink companies established in 1967
Organisations based in Coimbra
1967 establishments in Portugal